This is a list of members of the Victorian Legislative Assembly from 1955 to 1958, as elected at the 1955 state election:

  On 25 December 1955, the Labor member for Flemington, Jack Holland, died. His son Kevin Holland won the resulting by-election on 18 February 1956.
  In February 1956, the Liberal member for Mornington, William Leggatt, resigned to become Agent-General for Victoria in London. Liberal candidate Roberts Dunstan won the resulting by-election on 3 March 1956.
  On 17 March 1956, the Liberal member for Camberwell, Robert Whately, died in a car accident near Yass. Liberal candidate Vernon Wilcox won the resulting by-election on 21 April 1956.
  On 4 August 1957, the Labor member for Northcote and former Premier of Victoria, John Cain, died while campaigning for Labor at the Queensland election. Labor candidate Frank Wilkes won the resulting by-election on 21 September 1957.

Members of the Parliament of Victoria by term
20th-century Australian politicians